Albert Aleksander Üksip (8 December 1886 – 10 August 1966, in Tallinn) was an Estonian actor, botanist and translator.

He born in Narva. In 1902 he graduated from Narva city school. 1902-1923 he worked at Kreenholm Manufacturing Company.

References

External links
 Publications

1886 births
1966 deaths
People from Narva
Estonian male stage actors
20th-century Estonian botanists
Estonian translators
20th-century Estonian male actors
20th-century translators